Boyd Gaming Corporation is an American gaming and hospitality company based in Paradise, Nevada. The company continues to be run by founder Sam Boyd's family under the management of Sam's son, Bill Boyd (born 1931), who currently serves as the company's executive chairman after retiring as CEO in January 2008.

Gaming revenue is 80% of total gross revenue.

History
Boyd Gaming's history dates to 1941, when founder Sam Boyd first arrived in Las Vegas with his family.  After being hired as a dealer, Sam Boyd worked his way up through the ranks of the Las Vegas casino industry, first to pit boss, then shift boss.  He eventually saved enough to buy a small interest in the Sahara Hotel and Casino; later, Sam Boyd left the Sahara to become general manager and partner of The Mint Las Vegas.

Sam Boyd first partnered with his son Bill in 1962, when the two teamed up to acquire the Eldorado Casino in Henderson, Nevada.  Bill, who was then a practicing attorney, acquired his first stake in the Eldorado by doing its legal work.  Sam would go on to manage the Eldorado full-time after the Mint was sold in 1968.

Although the Boyd family had been involved in the Las Vegas casino industry for decades, Boyd Gaming Corporation wasn't founded until January 1, 1975, when the company was formed to develop and operate the California Hotel and Casino in downtown Las Vegas.  Then known as the Boyd Group, the company initially had 75 investors.

Boyd Gaming embarked on its first expansion in 1979, when it opened the first Sam's Town Hotel and Gambling Hall-branded property; Sam's Town Las Vegas on Boulder Highway at Nellis Boulevard.  Considered one of the first "locals" properties in the Las Vegas Valley, Sam's Town helped inaugurate the later development of Las Vegas' "Boulder Strip."

During these first two decades in operation, Sam and Bill Boyd developed a reputation for running a squeaky-clean operation. As a result, Nevada regulators turned to the Boyds for help following an investigation of skimming operations at the Stardust and Fremont casinos in the mid-1980s.  The properties were notorious at the time for their extensive skimming operations; according to the FBI, anywhere from $7 million to $15 million in funds from the Stardust were diverted to organized crime figures between 1974 and 1976 alone.

In 1984, after leveling a $3 million fine against the Stardust for skimming, the Nevada Gaming Commission asked the Boyds to run the property's gaming operations.  When the Stardust was taken over by the reputable Boyd family, they were surprised by its huge profits, now that every penny of income was being recorded. Ex-FBI agent William F. Roemer Jr., longtime senior agent of the FBI's organized-crime squad in Chicago and an expert in Las Vegas doings, said, "The amount of skim had been so heavy that the profit and loss statement did not present a true picture of the gold mine that the Stardust was."  After several years of successful operations, Boyd Gaming officially acquired the Stardust and Fremont in 1985.

Company founder Sam Boyd died on January 15, 1993, at the age of 82, and was succeeded as chief executive officer by Bill Boyd. In July of the same year, Boyd Gaming held its initial public offering of stock, debuting on the New York Stock Exchange under ticker symbol "BYD."

Funds from the IPO supplied Boyd Gaming with a source of capital for expansion, and the company embarked on a period of aggressive growth.  The company acquired the Eldorado and Jokers Wild (which had previously been owned directly by the Boyd family) in 1993; later that year, Boyd Gaming acquired the bankrupt Main Street Station Hotel and Casino and Brewery.

The company's first expansion outside of Nevada came in 1994, when Boyd Gaming opened Sam's Town Tunica in Mississippi.  Later expansions included:

 Silver Star Hotel and Casino, owned by the Mississippi Band of Choctaw Indians (opened in 1994; management contract expired in 2000);
 Treasure Chest Casino in Kenner, Louisiana (Boyd owned 15% of the property at its 1994 opening, before acquiring Treasure Chest outright in 1997);
 Sam's Town Kansas City (opened 1995, closed 1998);
 Par-A-Dice Hotel and Casino in East Peoria, Illinois. (acquired in 1996);
 Blue Chip Casino, Hotel and Spa in Michigan City, Indiana. (acquired in 1999);
 Delta Downs Racetrack Casino & Hotel, Vinton, Louisiana (acquired in 2001);
 Sam's Town Shreveport (formerly Harrah's Shreveport; acquired from Harrah's Entertainment in 2004).

Boyd Gaming's most ambitious expansion project came in 2003, when the company opened the $1.1 billion Borgata Hotel Casino in Atlantic City, N.J.  A joint venture with MGM Resorts International, Borgata was the first new casino property to open in Atlantic City in 13 years, and quickly emerged as the market's leading property by gaming revenue.  Borgata is by far Boyd Gaming's largest property, and currently supplies more than a third of the company's overall profits.

Less than a year after Borgata opened, Boyd Gaming announced plans to acquire Coast Casinos, Inc., one of the largest operators of locals casinos in the Las Vegas market. Completed on July 1, 2004, the $1.3 billion acquisition gave Boyd Gaming four additional Las Vegas properties—Suncoast; Gold Coast; the Orleans; and Barbary Coast.

The Coast acquisition also included the yet-to-be completed South Coast, located five miles (8 km) south of the Strip on Las Vegas Boulevard.  Boyd Gaming completed the project and opened its doors on December 22, 2005.  Boyd Gaming operated the property for less than a year before selling it to former Coast CEO Michael Gaughan in 2006.  (The property was rebranded to its current name, South Point, following the sale to Gaughan.)

In 2006, Boyd Gaming turned its focus to what would have been the largest project in its history: Echelon, a $4.8 billion resort complex at the site of the Stardust.  In preparation for the project, Boyd Gaming swapped the Barbary Coast to Harrah's Entertainment in exchange for 24 acres near the Stardust, giving the company an 87-acre parcel on the north end of the Strip.  The famed Stardust was closed on November 1, 2006, and imploded the night of March 13, 2007.

Construction on Echelon Place began on June 19, 2007, with plans to open in 2010, but was suspended a little over one year later, on August 1, 2008.  At the time, Boyd Gaming officials cited "the difficult environment in today's capital markets, as well as weak economic conditions," and estimated construction would resume in three to four quarters. As the global recession deepened, the suspension continued; in October 2009, the company said it would likely be three to five years before development resumed. However, in March 2013, Boyd sold the Echelon site for $350 million to the Genting Group, a Malaysia-based gaming company to develop the site as Resorts World Las Vegas.

In 2007, Boyd purchased Dania Jai Alai, a fronton in Dania Beach, Florida. The company hoped to expand the facility with a casino, but efforts to allow new casinos in the Miami area made little headway. Boyd agreed in 2011 to sell the property to Dania Entertainment for $80 million, but the deal was not completed. The two companies reached a new sale agreement in February 2013 for $65.5 million.

Boyd Gaming bought the IP Casino Resort & Spa in October 2011 for $278 million cash, plus a $10 million donation to the Engelstad Family Foundation.

In November 2012, Boyd acquired Peninsula Gaming, an Iowa-based company with five casinos in the Midwest and South, for $1.45 billion.

The company made two deals in 2016 to expand its footprint in the Vegas locals market, acquiring the Aliante Casino and Hotel for $380 million and the two properties of Cannery Casino Resorts for $230 million. Meanwhile, it sold its 50 percent stake in the Borgata to MGM for $900 million.

In July 2018, Boyd announced a partnership with MGM Resorts International "to significantly increase each company's market access and customer base throughout the United States." The partnership is focused on positioning both companies to succeed in the emerging online gambling and sports betting markets in the United States.

In late 2018, Boyd completed two deals to increase its regional holdings. It acquired Valley Forge Casino Resort in Pennsylvania for $281 million. It also purchased the operations of four casinos from Pinnacle Entertainment for $564 million: Ameristar Kansas City, Ameristar St. Charles, Belterra Casino, and Belterra Park. The company paid another $58 million for the real estate of Belterra Park. The sale was designed to ensure regulatory approval for Penn National Gaming's planned purchase of Pinnacle.

On July 13, 2020, Boyd Gaming announced it was laying off at least 25% of its workforce equating to thousands of job losses at its properties nationwide due to the COVID-19 pandemic in the United States.

In March 2022, Boyd Gaming entered into a definitive agreement to acquire Pala Interactive LLC and its subsidiaries for total cash consideration of $170 million. In November 2022, it was announced the deal had been completed. Pala Interactive LLC is an interactive online gaming company, majority owned by the Pala Band of Mission Indians.

List of properties

Downtown Las Vegas casinos
California Hotel and Casino
Fremont Hotel and Casino
Main Street Station

Other Las Vegas area casinos
Aliante Casino and Hotel
Cannery Casino and Hotel
Eastside Cannery Casino and Hotel
Gold Coast
Jokers Wild Casino
Orleans Hotel and Casino and Orleans Arena
Sam's Town Hotel and Gambling Hall, Las Vegas
Suncoast Hotel and Casino

Casinos in other states
Amelia Belle Casino — Amelia, Louisiana
Ameristar Casino Hotel Kansas City — Kansas City, Missouri
Ameristar Casino Resort Spa St. Charles — St. Charles, Missouri
Belterra Casino Resort & Spa — Florence, Indiana
Blue Chip Casino, Hotel and Spa — Michigan City, Indiana
Diamond Jo Casino — Dubuque, Iowa
Diamond Jo Casino — Northwood, Iowa
IP Casino Resort & Spa — Biloxi, Mississippi
Kansas Star Casino — Mulvane, Kansas
Par-A-Dice Hotel and Casino — East Peoria, Illinois
Sam's Town Hotel and Gambling Hall — Shreveport, Louisiana
Sam's Town Hotel and Gambling Hall — Tunica Resorts, Mississippi
Treasure Chest Casino — Kenner, Louisiana
Valley Forge Casino Resort — King of Prussia, Pennsylvania

Racinos
Belterra Park — Anderson Township, Hamilton County, Ohio
Delta Downs — Vinton, Louisiana
Evangeline Downs — Opelousas, Louisiana

Non-casino properties
Vacations-Hawaii — Honolulu, Hawaii with Charter Flights to Las Vegas, Nevada operated by Omni Air International

Former properties
Barbary Coast Hotel and Casino
Borgata — Atlantic City, New Jersey (50% ownership through Marina District Development)
Stardust Resort and Casino
Dania Jai-Alai — Dania Beach, Florida
Eldorado Casino (now The Pass Casino)
South Coast Hotel, Casino & Spa
Silver Star Hotel and Casino
Sam's Town Kansas City

References 

2009 Annual Report for statistical data

External links

 
 
 Boyd Gaming SEC Filings

 
 
Companies listed on the New York Stock Exchange
Gambling companies established in 1941
Hospitality companies of the United States
Companies based in Paradise, Nevada
Gambling companies of the United States
1941 establishments in Nevada